Chebogue Cemetery is the oldest burial ground in Yarmouth County, Nova Scotia, Canada (1771).  The most notable grave is of Captain Ephraim Cook (mariner).

References

External links
 

History of Nova Scotia
Cemeteries in Nova Scotia
1770s establishments in Nova Scotia
1771 establishments in North America
Buildings and structures in Yarmouth County